A constitutional referendum was held in Senegal on 7 January 2001. Voters were asked whether they approved of a new constitution. It was approved by 94% of voters, leading to early parliamentary elections taking place in April 2001.

Background
The proposed constitution would abolish the Senate, which had only come into existence in 1999; its first election had been boycotted by the opposition parties, who viewed its creation as unnecessary. It also reduced the presidential term from seven to five years.

Result

References

2001
2001 in Senegal
2001 referendums
Constitutional referendums